Julostylis is a genus of flowering plants in the family Malvaceae.

There are 3 species:
 Julostylis ampumalensis
 Julostylis angustifolia
 Julostylis polyandra

References

Hibisceae
Malvaceae genera
Taxonomy articles created by Polbot